Photo with Blue Sky, White Cloud, Wires, Windows and a Red Roof is an album by Norwegian saxophonist Jan Garbarek, released in 1979 on the ECM label and performed by Garbarek, John Taylor, Bill Connors, Eberhard Weber and Jon Christensen.

Reception
The Allmusic review by Scott Yanow awards the album 4 stars and states, "Jan Garbarek's icy and haunting tones on tenor and soprano are in the forefront during much of this set".

Track listing
All compositions by Jan Garbarek.

 "Blue Sky" – 6:45
 "White Cloud" – 9:06
 "Windows" – 6:46
 "Red Roof" – 7:49
 "Wires" – 5:20
 "The Picture" – 8:03

Personnel
Jan Garbarek – tenor saxophone, soprano saxophone
John Taylor – piano
Bill Connors – guitar
Eberhard Weber – bass
Jon Christensen – drums

References

Jan Garbarek albums
1979 albums
ECM Records albums
Albums produced by Manfred Eicher